Hu Lijiao (December 1914 – July 3, 2006) was a People's Republic of China politician. He was born in Ji'an, Jiangxi Province. He was the 3rd governor of the People's Bank of China (1964–1966) and the 1st Chairman of the People's Standing Congress of Henan Province (1979–1981) and 2nd Chairman of the People's Standing Congress of Shanghai (1981–1988).

1914 births
2006 deaths
People's Republic of China politicians from Jiangxi
Chinese Communist Party politicians from Jiangxi
Political office-holders in Henan
Political office-holders in Shanghai
Governors of the People's Bank of China
Politicians from Ji'an
Members of the 11th Central Committee of the Chinese Communist Party
Members of the 12th Central Committee of the Chinese Communist Party